Rizhao (598) is a Type 054A frigate of the People's Liberation Army Navy. She was commissioned on 12 January 2018.

Development and design 

The Type 054A carries HQ-16 medium-range air defence missiles and anti-submarine missiles in a vertical launching system (VLS) system. The HQ-16 has a range of up to 50 km, with superior range and engagement angles to the Type 054's HQ-7. The Type 054A's VLS uses a hot launch method; a shared common exhaust system is sited between the two rows of rectangular launching tubes.

The four AK-630 close-in weapon systems (CIWS) of the Type 054 were replaced with two Type 730 CIWS on the Type 054A. The autonomous Type 730 provides improved reaction time against close-in threats.

Construction and career 
Rizhao was launched on 1 April 2017 at the China State Shipbuilding Corporation in Shanghai. Commissioned on 12 January 2018.

In February 2023, the frigate was deployed to the south Indian Ocean to engage in joint exercises with the South African and Russian navies that were to be held in waters off South Africa. The exercise began on 18 February and involved the frigate Admiral Gorshkov and tanker Kama from the Russian Navy along with the People's Liberation Army Navy destroyer Huainan and the support ship Kekexilihu. Several vessels from the South African Navy were expected to participate including the frigate Mendi as well as the Warrior-class patrol vessel King Sekhukhune I and the hydrographic survey vessel SAS Protea.

References 

2017 ships
Ships built in China
Type 054 frigates